Associazione Calcio Somma was an Italian association football club located in Sommacampagna, Veneto. The best achievement of the team was the triumph in the 1977–78 edition of the Coppa Italia Dilettanti.  It lasted played in 2013–14 Promozione season. The jersey colours were white and blue.

Honours

Domestic competitions 
Coppa Italia Dilettanti:
Champions (1): 1977–78

External links 
Official homepage (closed)

Defunct football clubs in Italy
Association football clubs established in 1960
Football clubs in Veneto
Italian football clubs established in 1960